"Promise" is a song by American hip hop recording artist Kid Ink. The song was released on December 24, 2015 by Tha Alumni Music Group, 88 Classic and RCA Records, as the lead single from his sixth solo mixtape Summer in the Winter (2015). The track was produced by frequent collaborator DJ Mustard with additional writing by James Royo and Twice as Nice and features a hook by Fetty Wap.

Music video
The song's accompanying music video premiered on March 14, 2016 on Kid Ink's Vevo channel on YouTube. It was directed by Mike Ho.

Commercial performance
"Promise" debuted at number 92 on Billboard Hot 100 for the chart dated March 5, 2016. It eventually made it way to number 57. On August 24, 2017, the single was certified platinum by the Recording Industry Association of America (RIAA) for combined sales and streaming equivalent units of over a million units in the United States.

Charts

Weekly charts

Year-end charts

Certifications

References

External links

2015 singles
2015 songs
Kid Ink songs
Fetty Wap songs
Songs written by Fetty Wap
RCA Records singles
Song recordings produced by Mustard (record producer)
Songs written by Mustard (record producer)
Songs written by Kid Ink